This is a list of circuits which have hosted a Superbike World Championship round from  to . The first circuit that hosted a World Championship round was Donington Park.

List

See also
List of motor racing venues by capacity

Superbike World Championship